Peider Lansel (August 15, 1863 – December 8, 1943) was a Swiss Romansh lyric poet. He is most known for having revived Rhaeto-Romansh as a literary language. His family was from Sent, Switzerland, (although he was born in Pisa) and worked as a merchant, as well as being a poet.

External links
 Peider Lansel - BAINVEGNI at www.peiderlansel.ch
 
 
 The Districts of Obstana, Untertasna and Remüs from a personal website hosted on mindspring.com; no idea of further source.

1863 births
1943 deaths
Swiss male poets
Romansh-language writers
Romansh people
19th-century Swiss poets
20th-century Swiss poets
20th-century male writers
19th-century male writers